Ari Michael Lax is an American Magic: The Gathering player. Best known for winning the 2014 Pro Tour Khans of Tarkir, Lax's resume includes nine Grand Prix top eights including one win.

Achievements

References

Living people
American Magic: The Gathering players
People from Boston
Year of birth missing (living people)
Place of birth missing (living people)